Herbert Worth  (1847–1914) was an American baseball player at the dawn of the professional era. He played primarily for the amateur Star club of Brooklyn. On July 29, 1872, he played one game in the outfield of the Brooklyn Atlantics, in the National Association of Professional Base Ball Players, the first professional league now in its second season. He was 1 for 4 with a double, one run scored and one run batted in. He also umpired a National Association game on July 2, 1872.

References

External links

Retrosheet

Major League Baseball outfielders
Brooklyn Stars players
Brooklyn Atlantics players
19th-century baseball players
Major League Baseball umpires
1847 births
1914 deaths
Baseball players from New York (state)
Burials at Green-Wood Cemetery